Grundy High School is a public high school located east of Grundy, Virginia on Slate Creek in Buchanan County, Virginia. It is part of the Buchanan County Public Schools system. Athletic teams compete in the Virginia High School League's A Black Diamond District in 2A West Conference 39. Grundy is a National Blue Ribbon School.

Following the closing of Grundy Junior High at the end of the 1994-1995 school year, the High School's name was changed from Grundy Senior High School to Grundy High School.

Wrestling
The school is renowned for its wrestling program, which has won 26 state championships, the most of any high school in Virginia, and has been ranked nationally.  Grundy has produced more than 80 individual state champions.

Current Iowa State University wrestling coach Kevin Dresser was the head coach 1989-1996.
Travis Fiser has been the head coach since 1997.

Notable alumni
Lee Smith - Author (attended two years)
Jayma Mays - Actress (Red Eye, Paul Blart Mall Cop, Epic Movie, Glee)
Ryan O'Quinn - Actor
Heath Calhoun - US paralympian, Wounded Warrior Project spokesperson
Beverly Perdue - Former Governor of North Carolina
Francis Gary Powers - CIA pilot shot down flying a reconnaissance mission over the Soviet Union, precipitating the 1960 U2 Incident.

References

External links
 Grundy High School

Schools in Buchanan County, Virginia
Public high schools in Virginia
1963 establishments in Virginia
Educational institutions established in 1963